The Linwood Springs Research Station (LSRS) is a raptor research station located in Stevens Point, Wisconsin. Each fall, the station conducts studies on migrant Northern Saw-Whet Owls are to gain information about their migration routes, molt patterns, mortality rates, and winter and summer ranges.

The station also studies red-shouldered and sharp-shinned hawks. These are nesting ecology studies that are conducted annually to determine productivity, reoccupancy, natal dispersal, and nest site fidelity.

Additionally, each summer and fall a five-day raptor workshop is offered for those interested in gaining valuable field experience working with many of the techniques used in raptor studies.

External links
 LSRS Official Site

Raptor organizations
Biological stations
Research institutes in Wisconsin
Stevens Point, Wisconsin
Zoological research institutes
Ornithological organizations in the United States